Browndale is a ghost town in Clay County, Kansas, United States.

History
Browndale was located on the Union Pacific Railroad.

References

External links
 Clay County maps: Current, Historic, KDOT

Unincorporated communities in Clay County, Kansas
Unincorporated communities in Kansas